I'm with You World Tour 2012-13 is a live EP by American rock band Red Hot Chili Peppers, released in 2014 through their website as a free MP3 download. As a way to celebrate the culmination of the band's I'm with You World Tour, Chad Smith personally selected five of his favorite performances from select dates tour for fans to download for free.

Throughout the I'm with You Tour and the follow-up 2013/2014 Tour, 72 hours after each show's completion, the band has been releasing an official bootleg of each show to their website for fans to purchase as a download.

Track listing

Personnel
Red Hot Chili Peppers
 Anthony Kiedis – lead vocals
 Josh Klinghoffer – guitar, backing vocals
 Flea – bass, backing vocals
 Chad Smith – drums, percussion

Additional musicians
Mauro Refosco – percussion
 Chris Warren – keyboards

References

External links
Red Hot Chili Peppers website

Red Hot Chili Peppers live albums
2014 EPs
2014 live albums
Live EPs
Red Hot Chili Peppers EPs